South Clifton is a village and civil parish about 10 and a half miles north of Newark-on-Trent, in the Newark and Sherwood district, in the county of Nottinghamshire, England. In 2011, the parish had a population of 326. The parish touches Thorney, Girton, Fledborough, Wigsley, Marnham, Normanton on Trent, Spalford and North Clifton.

Features 
There are 8 listed buildings in South Clifton.

History 
The name "Clifton" means 'Cliff farm/settlement'. North and South Clifton were recorded in the Domesday Book as Cliftone/Cliftune/Cli(s)tone. South Clifton was a township in the parish of North Clifton, it became a separate parish in 1866. On the 25th of March 1885 an area of Marnham parish was transferred to the parish.

See also 
 St George the Martyr's Church, North & South Clifton

References 

Villages in Nottinghamshire
Civil parishes in Nottinghamshire
Newark and Sherwood